Weld is a surname of Anglo-Saxon English and Dutch origin.

Notable people
 Weld family, an extended English family going back to the 11th century
 Alfred Weld (1823-1890), leading English Jesuit and astronomer, grandson of Thomas Weld of Lulworth
 Cecil Weld-Forester, 1st Baron Forester (1767-1823), Anglican, Member of Parliament, added Weld name for inheritance
 Cecil Weld-Forester, 5th Baron Forester (1843-1917),  Conservative peer and Member of Parliament, son of Orlando
 Charles Richard Weld (1813-1869), English writer and historian, son of Isaac
 Charles Joseph Weld (1893-1962), officer in the British Indian Army in both World wars
 Dermot Weld (born 1949), Irish veterinarian and racehorse trainer
 Edward Weld (1705-1761), son of Humphrey Weld, sued at the Arches Court by his first wife, countersued and won
 Eadric the Wild (active 1068-70), nephew of the Duke of Mercia, Norman Conquest resister and presumed ancestor of Welds
 Edward Weld (1741-1775), English recusant landowner and first husband of Maria Fitzherbert
 Sir Frederick Weld (1823–1891), Prime minister of New Zealand, grandson of Thomas Weld of Lulworth
 George Weld-Forester, 3rd Baron Forester (1807-1886), Father of the House of Commons and Peer
 Henry Joseph Weld-Blundell (1848-1901), Australian politician
 Herbert Weld Blundell (1852 – 1935), English traveller in Africa, archaeologist, philanthropist and yachtsman
 Sir Humphrey Weld (c.1550-1610), member of the Worshipful Company of Grocers, Lord Mayor of London 
 Humphrey Weld (of Lulworth) (1612–1685) MP, purchaser of Lulworth estate, son of Sir John of Arnold's Court
 Isaac Weld (1774–1856), Irish explorer and artist
 Sir John Weld (1582–1622), of Arnold's Court, Edmonton, Middlesex, son of the Lord Mayor founded the Weld Chapel
 Sir John Weld (1613–1681), member of Parliament in 1679
 Sir John Weld (1615-1674), of Compton Bassett
 John Welde (1642), of Willye, High Sheriff of Shropshire
 John Weld-Forester, 2nd Baron Forester (1801-1877) Tory politician
 Joseph Weld (yachtsman) (1777-1863), recusant third son of Thomas Weld of Lulworth, competitive yachtsman
 Sir Joseph William Weld (1909-1992), army officer, landowner and Lord Lieutenant of Dorset
 Maria Weld (1756-1837), second wife of Edward Weld of Lulworth, better known as Mrs Fitzherbert
 Orlando Weld-Forester, 4th Baron Forester (1813-1894), British Peer and Anglican clergyman
 Thomas Welde (1595-1661), temporary Puritan emigrant from Essex to New England
 Thomas Weld (of Lulworth) (1750-1810), recusant landowner of Lulworth and philanthropist, father of fifteen children 
 Thomas Weld (cardinal) (1773–1837), eldest son of Thomas Weld of Lulworth, English Roman Catholic cardinal
 Thomas Weld Blundell (1808-1883), landowner grandson of Thomas Weld of Lulworth, added Blundell name for inheritance
 Wilfrid Weld (1934-2015), landowner and restorer of Lulworth Castle
 William Weld (1649–1698), son of Sir John of Compton Basset, landowner

 Weld family, an extended family of New England
 Charles Goddard Weld, 1857–1911, physician and philanthropist
 Daniel S. Weld, computer scientist
 Ezra Greenleaf Weld, 1801–1874, a photographer
 Francis Weld Peabody, 1881-1927, American physician and Harvard Medical School teacher
 George Walker Weld, 1840–1905, philanthropist, athlete
 Greg Weld, race car driver and manufacturer
 Isabel Weld Perkins, 1876–1948
 John Weld Peck (1874 – 1937), a United States District Judge for Ohio
 John Weld (1905 - 2003), newspaper reporter in New York
 Philip Saltonstall Weld, 1915–1984, newspaper publisher and yacht racer
 Seth L. Weld, Philippine–American War Medal of Honor recipient
 Stephen Minot Weld, 1806–1867, schoolmaster, investor, and politician
 Stephen Minot Weld, Jr., 1842–1920, horticulturist and Army officer
 Susan Roosevelt Weld, wife of William Weld
 Theodore Dwight Weld, 1803–1895, an abolitionist
 Theresa Weld Blanchard (1893–1978), a figure skater
 Tuesday Weld, 1943–, an actress
 William Weld, former Governor of Massachusetts
 William Gordon Weld, 1775–1825, ship owner
 William Fletcher Weld, 1800–1881, ship owner